Colonel Luis Arturo Rodríguez Meneses Air Base  is a Colombian military base assigned to the Colombian Air Force (Fuerza Aérea Colombiana or FAC) Eastern Air Group (Grupo Aéreo del Oriente or GAORI). The base is located in Marandúa, near Santa Rita, in the Vichada department of Colombia. It is named in honor of Colonel Luis Arturo Rodríguez Meneses.

Facilities 
There is also a closed grass runway designated 03/21 which measures .

See also
Transport in Colombia
List of airports in Colombia

References

Airports in Colombia
Colombian Air Force
Military installations of Colombia
Buildings and structures in Vichada Department